John Dowie Borthwick (1867–1936) was a veterinary surgeon in the Cape Colony, South Africa

Early life 

Borthwick was born in Kirkliston, Scotland to John Borthwick (also a vet) and Janet Dowie.  He studied veterinary medicine at the Edinburgh College of Medicine and Veterinary Medicine.

Personal life 

Borthwick married a descendant of the 1820 Settlers, Elizabeth Edith Walton in Grahamstown on 17 Mar 1893, The bacteriologist Alexander Edington who was his close colleague witnessed the marriage.  He died at his Arcadia North home in Pretoria on 18 June 1936.

Veterinary work 

Borthwick began his career in South Africa on 27 March 1889 as the first assistant to Duncan Hutcheon, Colonial Veterinary Surgeon to the Cape of Good Hope. Jotello Festiri Soga the first black South African vet worked with him as Hutcheon's second assistant.

In 1892 he joined Alexander Edington in his laboratory (previously buildings in the Royal Engineers yard) in Grahamstown. Borthwick served as Edington's assistant in the study of animal diseases until 1893 when he was succeeded by Thomas Bowhill

Later he served as Assistant Veterinary Surgeon in various parts of the Cape Colony. In July 1906 he was promoted to the post of Chief Veterinary Surgeon vacated by Hutcheon when the latter was promoted to the post of Director of Agriculture. He then had 16 Assistant Veterinary Surgeons under his control in the Cape.

Borthwick did important work in finding a prophylaxis for lamsiekte in cattle.  He found feeding cattle bonemeal prevented the disease.  His work was quoted as recently as 2012 by Bigalke.

Military service 

During the Boer War he served in the Town Guards and District Mounted Troops.

Notes and references 

 
 
 
 
 
 

 
 
 

1867 births
1936 deaths
South African veterinarians
People in health professions from Edinburgh
Scottish emigrants to South Africa
Alumni of the University of Edinburgh
People of the Boer Wars